The 1897 New Hampshire football team was an American football team that represented New Hampshire College of Agriculture and the Mechanic Arts during the 1897 college football season—the school became the University of New Hampshire in 1923. The team played a seven-game schedule and finished with a record of 2–5.

Schedule
Scoring during this era awarded four points for a touchdown, two points for a conversion kick (extra point), and five points for a field goal. Teams played in the one-platoon system and the forward pass was not yet legal. Games were played in two halves rather than four quarters.

The team's original schedule included games against Holy Cross, Maine, and Boston College. New Hampshire would not play these teams until 1909, 1903, and 1899, respectively.

The October 2 game in Amherst was the first meeting in the New Hampshire–Massachusetts football rivalry.

The final game of the season was awarded to Dover by a score of 6–0, as the New Hampshire team left the field due to rough play. The score on the field had been 6–0 in favor of New Hampshire at the time the game was abandoned.

Roster

Source:

Notes

References

Further reading
 

New Hampshire
New Hampshire Wildcats football seasons
New Hampshire football